Union Township is one of eight townships in Cumberland County, Illinois, USA.  As of the 2010 census, its population was 690 and it contained 313 housing units.

Geography

Cities, towns, villages
 Casey (west edge)

Unincorporated towns
 Maple Point at 
 Union Center at 
 Vevay Park at

Cemeteries
The township contains these nine cemeteries: Bell, Decker, Garrett, Jack Oak, Long Point, Macedonia, Neal, Nebo and Union.

Major highways
  Interstate 70
  U.S. Route 40
  Illinois Route 130

Demographics

School districts
 Casey-Westfield Community Unit School District 4c
 Cumberland Community Unit School District 77

Political districts
 State House District 110
 State Senate District 55

References
 
 United States Census Bureau 2009 TIGER/Line Shapefiles
 United States National Atlas

External links
 City-Data.com
 Illinois State Archives
 Township Officials of Illinois

Adjacent townships 

Townships in Cumberland County, Illinois
Charleston–Mattoon, IL Micropolitan Statistical Area
1860 establishments in Illinois
Populated places established in 1860
Townships in Illinois